Smaug barbertonensis (also known as the Barberton dragon lizard or Barberton girdled lizard) is a species of lizard in the family Cordylidae. It is a small lizard found in eastern South Africa and Eswatini.

References

Smaug (genus)
Reptiles of Eswatini
Reptiles of South Africa
Reptiles described in 1921